JSC Georgian State Electrosystem (GSE) is the single Electricity Transmission System Operator (TSO) acting in Georgia. In this status, GSE provides the overall coordination of the country’s electricity system and balancing of electricity supply and demand. The company also regulates the exchange of electricity with neighboring countries and is actively cooperating with network operators in neighboring countries. GSE, as the single TSO, is responsible to balance the power supply and demand, also reliable power supply in real time.

General Information
GSE is a joint stock company owned by the LEPL National Agency of State Property, while its management rights are transferred to the Ministry of Economy and Sustainable Development of Georgia.

Transmission network is managed by the National Dispatch Center and its technical maintenance is provided by the 4 regional networks (East, West, South and Kakheti). GSE also manages the cross-border transmission lines interconnecting with the neighboring countries: Russia, Turkey, Armenia and Azerbaijan. To perform repairs, the company implements the scheduled outages of system-wide transmission lines and substations, and temporarily restricts the power supply, if necessary. The company develops relay protection schemes and analyzes accidents in the network. To use energy resources optimally, the National Dispatch Centre located at GSE headquarters coordinates the activities of electricity market participants. It also manages the transmission network in standard and emergency situations

History
JSC Georgian State Electrosystem was established in 2002 through the merger of Electrodispetcherizatsia Ltd. and JSC Elektrogadatsema. Since December 2002, GSE management was carried out by the Irish company ESB International which had acquired the company 5-year management right in the tender “Wholesale Electricity Market Support Project” announced by the World Bank. In 2007, after the completion of the project, the management of GSE was transferred to the Georgian board of directors.

Governing bodies of GSE are: General meeting of the shareholder, the Supervisory Board, Director General.  Director General of the company is George Gigineishvili.

See also

 Energy in Georgia (Country)

External links
• http://www.gse.com.ge

• https://www.facebook.com/electrosystema/

Energy companies of Georgia (country)
Electric power companies of Georgia (country)
Companies based in Tbilisi
Energy companies established in 2002
2002 establishments in Georgia (country)